Włocławek is a city located in central Poland along the Vistula (Wisła) River and is bordered by the Gostynin-Włocławek Landscape Park. As of December 2021, the population of the city is 106,928. Located in the Kuyavian-Pomeranian Voivodeship, it was the capital of Włocławek Voivodeship until 1999.

The city is located in the historical region of Kuyavia and is the region's third largest city after Bydgoszcz and Toruń.

History
Włocławek's history dates back to the late Bronze Age – early Iron Age (1300 BCE – 500 BCE). Archaeological excavations conducted on the current city site uncovered the remains of a settlement belonging to the Lusatian culture, as well as evidence of a settlement of early Pomeranian culture which had been established. Traces of additional settlements dating to the Roman period and the early Middle Ages have also been excavated in the area.

Middle Ages

Precise dating of the city's founding has proven difficult. Since the 16th century, there is conflicting data in relation to the establishment of the town. The confusion lies with varying attributions of the city's name (which was derived from the first name Władysław, or Vladislav) and its subsequent rulers; Władysław II the Exile, (Polish: Władysław II Wygnaniec) (1105 – 30 May 1159) a High Duke of Poland and Duke of Silesia from 1138 until his expulsion in 1146. His grandfather Władysław I Herman, or Vladislav II of Bohemia. Civil war between these generations, due to a royal title granted as a lifetime honorific from Holy Roman Emperor, but did not provide for a hereditary monarchy. This resulted in church reformations and a lack of documentation for the area.

One of the earliest references to the town came from an assistant to the Archbishop of Gniezno who was noted as residing in the town in 1123. Later the Diocese of Włocławek of Kuyavia in 1148, notates its existence in a bull issued by Pope Eugene III, while mentioning the first bishop of Włocławek as Warner. Warner was followed by an Italian, Onoldius; the diocese was recorded as "Włocławek and Pomerania" (Vladislaviensis et Pomeraniae).

Włocławek received its town rights in 1255. During the 14th and 15th centuries, the city was destroyed and captured several times by the Teutonic Knights and renamed it Leslau. The Treaty of Thorn, signed in 1411, resulted in short-lived peace for the city, however, it prospered from its involvement in the ransoming of the captured Teutonic Knights which was payable in three instalments and proved to be a hardship on the Prussian faction. Włocławek was located within the Brześć Kujawski Voivodeship of the Greater Poland Province of the Polish Crown.

Modern era

In 1569, Bishop Stanisław Karnkowski founded a theological seminary in Włocławek, one of the oldest seminaries in Poland. In 1625, the Reformed Franciscans were brought to Włocławek by Bishop Andrzej Lipski, and soon their Baroque monastery was built.

During the Swedish invasion of 1657, Second Northern War, the city was partially destroyed. After the Second Partition of Poland of 1793, Włocławek became part of Prussia. After the Treaties of Tilsit in 1807 it became part of the Polish short-lived Duchy of Warsaw. Subsequently, after the Congress of Vienna it became part of Congress Poland in the Russian Partition of Poland in 1815. Polish insurgents operated in the city and in its vicinity during the January Uprising of 1863–1864. The insurgents clashed with Russian troops in Włocławek on November 8, 1863 and February 17, 1864. The oldest Polish theological journal  has been published in Włocławek since 1909. The city was again destroyed during the battles of German offensive during the First World War. After Poland declared independence in 1918, Włocławek was reintegrated into Polish territory. In 1920, Poles successfully defended the city against the invading Soviets during the Polish–Soviet War.

World War II

During World War II, Włocławek was occupied by German troops, which entered the city on 14 September 1939. Under the Nazi German occupation Włocławek was again renamed Leslau, annexed by decree to the German Reich on 8 October 1939 and administered from 26 October as a part of Reichsgau Posen (renamed on 29 January 1940 Reichsgau Wartheland).

Already in September 1939, Germans committed a massacre of a group of local Jews and burned both synagogues. The Einsatzgruppe III entered the city between September 23 and October 5, 1939, and afterwards carried out mass arrests of local Poles in October and November as part of the Intelligenzaktion. Dozens of Catholic priests from Włocławek, including Auxiliary Bishop of Włocławek Michał Kozal, and lecturers and students of the seminary were arrested, and then deported in January 1940 to the Dachau concentration camp, where most of them were killed. Rector of the local seminary Henryk Kaczorowski and two students Bronisław Kostkowski and Tadeusz Dulny are now considered three of the 108 Blessed Polish Martyrs of World War II by the Catholic Church. Local teachers were arrested in October 1939, and then deported to concentration camps and murdered. In late 1939, the SS and Selbstschutz burnt down the Grzywno district and murdered many of its inhabitants in the nearby village of Warząchewka Polska. Poles from Włocławek were also massacred in the nearby village of Pińczata. Arrested Polish teachers, landowners and priests from the Włocławek and Lipno counties were also imprisoned in Włocławek, and some were later also deported to concentration camps and murdered.

Families of deported and murdered Poles, as well as the remaining residents of Grzywno were expelled to the so-called General Government in late 1939, and in 1940 also owners of shops, workshops and bigger houses were expelled, so their properties could be handed over to German colonists as part of the Lebensraum policy. The Germans also robbed the precious historical collections of the Diocese of Włocławek and the Baroque Franciscan monastery and closed down the cathedral. The city's central square, Plac Wolności ("Liberty Square"), was renamed Adolf-Hitler-Platz by the Germans. By the time the war ended, nearly the entire Jewish population of more than 10,000 had been murdered.

Włocławek was liberated on 20 January 1945 by Soviet troops of the 1st Belorussian Front during the Vistula–Oder Offensive. One third of the city was destroyed, but its factories and workshops were rebuilt by the Polish government in the following decades.

Recent period
The most important industries in Włocławek today are chemical industry, production of furniture, and food processing. The dam which was constructed in 1969 regulates the water level of the Vistula river, forming Włocławek Reservoir.

The Catholic priest Fr. (now Blessed), Jerzy Popiełuszko, who was associated with the workers' and trade union movement Solidarity, and who was also a member of the opposition to the Communist regime in Poland, was tortured and murdered by three Security Police officers, and was thrown into the Włocławek Reservoir, close to the city. His body was recovered from the reservoir on 30 October 1984.

From 2012 the city is part of the Special Economic Zone - Włocławek Economic Development Area – Industrial and Technological Park with tax-free areas and incentives for investors.

The Jewish Community in Włocławek

The Jewish population increased from 218 (6.6%) in 1820 to 6,919 in 1910 (20.5%) and 13,500 in 1939. One of the founders of the Mizracḥi movement, rabbi Leib Kowalski (1895–1925), lived and worked in Włocławek. During the interbellum period, the town had several Jewish schools (primary and high schools), two yeshivas, and three Jewish sports clubs.

With the beginning of the German occupation of Poland, Włocławek became the first town in Europe in which Jews were required to wear distinctive yellow badges. Murders of Jews began in 1939 and the Włocławek ghetto was created in November 1940. The Nazis deported 3,000 of Włocławek's Jews to ghettos and labor camps between December 1939 and June 1941. Some 2,000 Jews were deported to Łódź and then to the Chełmno extermination camp between 26 and 30 September 1941. The ghetto was burnt in late April 1942 after the remaining Jews were sent to Chelmno where they were immediately gassed. Most of the Jews sent to the Łódź Ghetto died of starvation or illness, and many were sent to Auschwitz from Łódź.

After the war nearly 1000 Jews returned to Włocławek and re-established their community. However, Jews left after disputes within the community itself, and the desire of most Jews not to live under Communism, installed by the Soviets. By the late 1960s, the community had disappeared.

Today there is only very little, if any trace at all, of their once rich and lively community. There is a table for victims of Jewish ghetto in Włocławek's Rakutówek neighborhood (Polish Tablica Ofiar Getta we Włocławku) and Jewish Cemetery at Municipal/Communal Cemetery (Polish Cmentarz Komunalny we Włocławku).

Historical monuments

 Copernicus Square
Copernicus Square (Polish: Plac Kopernika) is located near the cathedral school of the Basilica Cathedral of St. Mary Assumption in Włocławek where Nicolaus Copernicus studied between 1488 and 1491. Together with his teacher, Mikołaj Wódka (Abstemius), he built a sundial for the Cathedral Basilica. In the square there is the monument of Nicolaus Copernicus, the main office of the Higher Seminary, founded in 1569 (first seminary in Poland, and also one of the oldest in the world).

 St. Witalis Church

St. Witalis Church, 1330, is the oldest Gothic building in Włocławek. Inside the church there are works of Polish 15th-century painting, including a triptych with the scene of the Crowning of St. Mary (1460). In front of the Basilica Cathedral there is a monument of prominent Polish primate Stefan Wyszyński who lived in Włocławek between 1917 and 1946.

 Basilica Cathedral of St. Mary of the Assumption
Gothic Basilica Cathedral of St. Mary of the Assumption was built in 1340-1411 and was later rebuilt. It is one of the oldest and tallest (86 m) churches in Poland, and it is listed as a Historic Monument of Poland. The basilica includes: 
 Tombstone of Piotr from Bnin, sculpted by Veit Stoss - 1493, 
 Chapter house - 1521
 Renaissance chapel - 1604-1611
 Gothic stained glass windows - 1360, the oldest ones in Poland
 Tombstone of Marcin Talibowski - 1493 
 Painting by Francisco de Zurbarán - 17th century
 The Tumski Crucifix
 The largest painting on a single board in Poland - 1470
 Stained glass windows by Józef Mehoffer
 Sculpture, The Last Supper - 1505 
 Painting by Juan Correa de Vivar - 1565
 Eucharistic Throne – one of the most magnificent silver masterpieces in Europe - 1744
 Candelabrum by Hans Meyer - 1596

 The Henryk Sienkiewicz Municipal Park

Municipal Park named after Henryk Sienkiewicz (Polish: Park Miejski im. Henryka Sienkiewicza) is one of the oldest parks in Poland. In the park there is a bust of Henryk Sienkiewicz, a prominent writer and the winner of the Nobel Prize for Quo Vadis.

 Bishop's Palace
Bishop's Palace (Polish: Pałac Biskupi) is located on the Gdanska street by the river. It served as the bishop's residence from 1858 to 1861 and includes a garden.

 Marshall Józef Piłsudski Boulevards

Marshall Józef Piłsudski Boulevards (Polish: Bulwary im. Marszałka Józefa Piłsudskiego): Historic houses in the Old Marketplace, Church of St. John the Baptist, Bridge of Marschall Edward Rydz-Smigły, Art Museum, Ethnographic Museum, high schools and Marshal Office.

 Brewery B Culture Center 
The former brewery built in 1832 houses a modern culture center with a concert hall, culture associations, small cinema, museum of measurements and café.
 Black Granary
Black Granary (Polish: Czarny Spichrz) was built between the 18th and 19th centuries. It is the only construction of that kind that still exists in Poland. It currently houses the Dobrzynsko-Kujawskie Cultural Society and the Art Club Piwnica.

 Church of St. John the Baptist
Church of St. John the Baptist (Polish: Kościół pw. Św. Jana Chrzciciela) have Gothic and Baroque style, brick-layered, from 1538. The interior is in the Baroque style, it includes a Guardian Angel painting (1635), a baroque font - 17th century, a Rococo pulpit - 18th century, a sculpture of John Baptist from Venice (Polish Jan Baptysta Wenecjanin).
 All Saints church and Franciscan-Reformers cloister
All Saints church and Franciscan-Reformers cloister (Polish: Parafia i Klasztor Ojców Franciszkanów) was built in 1639–1644, in Baroque style with Gothic elements. Here is a Baroque aisle and Rococo altars from the 18th century.
 Evangelical church
Evangelical church (Polish: Kościół Ewangelicki) was built 1877–79, but in the 17th century was here a wooden church, with an interesting altar with painting in convention of Paul Delaroche.
 Liberty (Freedom) Square
Liberation Square (Polish: Plac Wolności) It is the town's central square, with the monument dedicated to the Polish soldiers of the II World War, a hotel Zajazd Polski (18th century), restaurant, banks and shops. Here is the All Saints church and Franciscan-Reformers cloister, Mühsam Palace from the 19th century.
 The Włocławek Dam

The Włocławek Dam (Polish: Zapora Wodna na Wiśle, Tama we Włocławku) was built in 1970 and is the largest reservoir in Poland. On the right river's bank a monumental crucifix has been erected to commemorate priest Jerzy Popiełuszko murdered by the communist police.
 Wzorcownia
Shopping and entertainment center in the former faience factory of Teichefeld & Atserblum from 1873.
 Green Market
Green Market (Polish: Zielony Rynek) is the historical place of trade. There are tenement houses from the 19th and 20th century, as well as a baker's shop, confectionery store, and clothes stores. Here is also the Main City Office with Mayor's Bureau and Gallery of Modern Art.
 Municipal Cemetery
Municipal/ Communal Cemetery (Polish: Cmentarz Komunalny we Włocławku) - central cemetery in the city between streets: Komunalna, Chopina, Aleja Królowej Jadwigi. There are here parts: Polish, Jewish, German (Protestants, Evangelicals), Russian (Russian-Orthodox Church), victims of 1. and 2. World War. Here is also the Russian Orthodox Church.
 Numerous World War II memorials

Museums

 Diocesan Museum
Next to Basilica Cathedral there is the Diocesan Museum (Polish Muzeum Diecezjalne) with paintings by Guercino, and prints by Albrecht Dürer. The Seminary Library of Chodynski Brothers keeps precious manuscripts, including missals from 1500.
 Museum of the Kujawy and Dobrzyn Land 
 Main Edifice
It hosts two permanent exhibitions: "Włocławek`s Faience" and "The Gallery of Polish portraits" with works by Józef Simmler, Teodor Axentowicz (neoclassicism); Leon Wyczółkowski (impressionism); Jacek Malczewski and Vlastimil Hofman (symbolism), Józef Mehoffer, Stanisław Ignacy Witkiewicz, Wojciech Kossak, Alfons Karpiński, Olga Boznańska (1920s and 1930s), Anthony van Dyck or Marcello Bacciarelli.
 The Ethnography Museum
The museum is located in a historic granary and hosts an exhibition by Franciszek Tournelle. It showcases the most important elements of folk culture and equipment of house interior and farm of Kuyavia: farming, breeding, fishing, pottery, blacksmithing, cart-wrighting, cooperage, plaiting, historic folk sculpture, shrovetide customs, and musical instruments.

 The Museum of the History of Włocławek
The museum consists of two historic Baroque houses from the 16th and 18th century on the Old Market. They exhibit artefacts connected with the history of Włocławek and Poland from archaeological excavations to Liberation of Włocławek in 1945 including the Bowl of Włocławek (10th century) and elements of knights armour (14th and 15th century), objects related to the economic life of Włocławek (16th and 17th century), measures and weights, treasures with coins from the 12th to 18th centuries, pharmaceutics from the 19th and 20th centuries, memorabilia of big industry in the 19th century, memorabilia of the Fire Department, sports trophies, uniforms, firearms, weapons, photographs and the archives of national uprisings, Polish-Soviet War (1919-1921), interwar decades, and World War I and World War II, models of non-existent buildings (city hall, St. Wojciech Church and St. Mikołaj Orthodox Church) and the reconstruction of a photo atelier.
The Art Collection
A sizeable art collection is also located in a granary built in 1839. There are two permanent exhibitions there: religious (human and animal sculptures by Stanisław Zagajewski known as "Polish Gaudi" from group of l`art brut) and an exhibition of works by Wacław Bębnowski (ceramic sculptures and functional objects with Art Nouveau motifs, naked nymphs and elements of the Far East).  
Exhibitions of Italian, German or Netherlandish art from 17th/18th centuries include: 
Paintings by Carlo Cignani, Georg Philipp Rugendas, Francesco de' Rossi, 
graphs of Rembrandt van Rijn, Albrecht Altdorfer, Heinrich Aldegrever, Parmigianino, Vespasiano Strada oder Lucas van Leyden.

Włocławek districts

Michelin
Południe (South)
Rybnica
Śródmieście (City centre)
Wschód Leśny (East forest area)
Wschód Mieszkaniowy (East residential area), a.k.a. Dzielnica Wschód (East District)
Wschód Przemysłowy (East industrial area), a.k.a. Dzielnica Wschód (East District)
Zachód Przemysłowy (West industrial area)
Zawiśle
Zazamcze.

Culture and free time

 Culture center Browar B
 OSIR - Sports center with new football stadium, swimming pool, aqua park, tennis courts or sea resorts
 Yacht areas: Przystań nad Wisłą OSIR we Włocławku, Przystań OSIR nad Zalewem Włocławskim (with place for campers), Marina Yacht Club Anwil in Zarzeczewo (with place for camping)
 Wakepark Włocławek
 Theater: Teatr Impresaryjny im. W. Gniazdowskiego, Teatr "Nasz", Teatr Skene
 Gallery of Modern Art, Galeria at Kuyavia-Dobrzyń Culture Society, Galeria SK, Galeria Migawka, Galeria Antresola,
 Music clubs und Discos, including Million Club, Mistrz i Malgorzata, Starodebska Music Bar and Music club at Lucky Star Bowling Wzorcownia
 Gostynin-Włocławek Landscape Park with over 40 lakes
 Rope parks: Park Linowy Włocławek Jezioro Czarne (at Lake Czarne) or Park Linowy Włocławek Aleja Kazimierza Wielkiego (at Kazimierz Wielki Avenue)
 Airport Kruszyn and Aeroklub Włocławek
 Shopping and entertainment center Wzorcownia Włocławek
 Shopping mall Focus Park Włocławek
 Horse clubs: Arabians Falborek, Pensjonat Michelin, Klub Jeździecki Bogucin
 Golfclub Kujawy
 Diving center Mr Jacques
 Quad-Park in Włocławek.
 Fitness and Gymnastic clubs: Klub Forma, Pure Fitness or Herkules.
 Judo and Karate Center IKT
 Games center: Lucky Star Bowling Wzorcownia (bowling, snooker, darts, pinball etc.) or Sport Bowling Włocławek 
 Paintball clubs
 A developed network of bike lanes.

Sports clubs

 Anwil Włocławek – men's basketball team, which competes in the country's top flight, three-time Polish Champion (2003, 2018, 2019)
 Włocłavia Włocławek – men's football team, which competes in the lower leagues, and played on the Polish second tier in season 1997–1998
 Kujawiak Włocławek – defunct men's football team, which competed on the second tier in season 2004–2005
 Włocławek Rowing Association (Włocławskie Towarzystwo Wioslarskie) - rowing team, former Polish and world Champions; created in 1886.

Business

According to Rzeczpospolita report: the major corporations are:
 Anwil SA - Orlen Group, Poland
 Brügmann sp. z o.o. - Salamander Industrie Produkte Group, Germany
 Guala Closures DGS Poland SA - Italy
 Indorama Ventures - Poland, India/Thailand
 PSH Lewiatan - Poland
 Wika Polska - Germany

There are many other international companies: Delecta (Rieber&Son)- Orkla Group, Norway; Top2000 - Hamelin Group, France; Drumet - WireCo Group, USA; Kujawianka/ ATlanta Poland (Bakal Group), Poland; ACPCO2 - Belgium; Koło, Sanitec Group - France; Teutonia, Newell Rubbermaid Group - USA; Solvay - Belgium; ACV- Belgium; Remwil, Orlen Group, Poland; Budizol, Poland; Naturana - Germany; PV Prefabet, PV Group - Germany. Many transport and logistic companies have branches in or near the city.

From 2012 the city is part of the Pomeranian Special Economic Zone - Włocławek Economic Development Area – Industrial and Technological Park with tax-free areas and incentives for investors. The city is located at the A1 highway and close to the A2 highway, directly to three Polish National roads, riverway (Vistula) to Gdańsk, Berlin or Warsaw and fast rail line with many directions. Włocławek has also own energy plants (Power Plant of Anwil/ Orlen, Municipal Power Plant of City Włocławek, Water Power Plant on Vistula River).

Another investment in Włocławek is Teren Inwestycyjny Papieżka (Investment area Papiezka) with full infrastructure and railway siding.

There are also big investment areas near Włocławek, for example in Brześć Kujawski (Brzeska Strefa Gospodarcza/ BSG). It is directly at A1 motorway ("Amber One"), railway number 18 and has 470 ha open areas for different investments. There are here internal roads, lighting, power and water infrastructure. Here are public and private lots, the most of them free of real estate tax and CIT tax. Here invested already Raben Group and Mercator Medical S.A.,

Another investment zone with full infrastructure is Czerniewice Logistic Park of company Arplast in Czerniewice, it is also at A1 motorway and railway line. The biggest advantage is its own railway siding, that is very rare in Poland.

Education

Universities and colleges

Currently there are five universities or colleges or branches: 
 Państwowa Szkoła Wyższa PSWW Włocławek/Higher State School in Włocławek PSWW (former PWSZ we Włocławku/ Higher Vocational State School PWSZ in Włocławek)
 Wyższa Szkoła Humanistyczno-Ekonomiczna WSHE Włocławek/ College of Humanistics and Economics WSHE in Włocławek
 Wyższa Szkoła Techniczna Włocławek / Higher Technical School in Włocławek
 Wyższa Szkoła Informatyki i Umiejętności Łódź, branch in Włocławek/ Higher School of IT and Skills
 Uniwersytet Mikołaja Kopernika w Toruniu Wydział Teologiczny we Włocławku (Wyższe Seminarium Duchowne Włocławek)

High schools
 I LO im. Ziemi Kujawskiej, ul. Mickiewicza 6 in Włocławek is one of the best high school in the city and in the Kuyavian-Pomeranian Voivodeship
 History of the school

In early 1900 the Committee of Civic, which was chaired by Louis Bauer requested the Ministry of Finance to set up a trade school. 27 April 1900, the Ministry of Finance agreed to the creation of Włocławskie Siedmioklasowej School of Economics. The founders of the school were 104 inhabitants. The school admitted students were between the ages of 8 to 11 years who, after the annual rate became the first class of students. Powers available to the school received a state school,
 Publiczne Liceum im. Jana Długosza we Włocławku
 II LO im. Mikołaja Kopernika, ul. Urocza 3
 III LO im. Marii Konopnickiej, ul. Bechiego 1
 IV LO im. Kamila Krzysztofa Baczyńskiego, ul. Kaliska 108
 V LO im. Unii Europejskiej, ul. Toruńska 77/83/

Twin areas

This area has twinning with the following:
 Mogilev, Belarus;
 Bedford, United Kingdom;
 Izmail, Ukraine;
 Saint-Avold, France.

Notable people

 Andrzej Kalwas (born 1936), Polish politician, businessman and solicitor
 Sholem Asch (1880 –1957), Polish-Jewish writer
 Katy Carr (born 1980), British singer, she spent childhood in Włocławek
 Nicolaus Copernicus (1473–1543), astronomer, may have studied in the cathedral school in Włocławek run by Mikołaj Wodka (Abstemius) in 1488–91; Wodka and his pupil probably built a sundial, that we can see on Cathedral Basilica of the Assumption of Mary,
 Anton Denikin (1872–1947), Russian Lieutenant General in the Imperial Russian Army 
 Jerzy Engel (born 1952), former coach of Poland national football team
 Roman Kozłowski (1889–1977), Polish paleontologist
 Francis de Sales Lewental (1839-1902), publisher
 Leon Marchlewski (1869–1946), Polish chemist, one of the founders in the field of chlorophyll chemistry
 Aharon Megged (1920–2016), Israeli author, awarded the Israel Prize for literature
 Henryk Muszyński (born 1933), Polish bishop
 Jan Nagórski (1888–1976), Polish engineer and pioneer of aviation, the first man to fly over the North Pole
 Jerzy Popiełuszko (1947–1984), Polish Blessed Roman Catholic priest who became associated with the opposition Solidarity trade union in communist Poland. He was killed in 1984 by three agents of Służba Bezpieczeństwa (Security Service of the Ministry of Internal Affairs)
 Marcel Reich-Ranicki (1920–2013), German literary critic, known as "Pope of literature's critic", he had one of the most important TV-shows in Germany
 Tadeusz Reichstein (1897–1996), Polish-Swiss Nobel Prize Winner in chemistry
 Maryla Rodowicz (born 1945), popular Polish Singer
 Chaim F. Shatan (1924–2001), Canadian physician and psychiatrist who defined posttraumatic stress disorder
 Bernard Pullman (1919–1996), French theoretical quantum chemist
 Marie Steiner-von Sivers (1867–1948), German-Russian co-founder of Anthroposophy and the art of eurythmy
 Rachel Steinman Clarke (died 1944), violinist
 Jakub Świnka (?–1314), Polish bishop
 Henri Tajfel (1919–1982), Polish social psychologist
 Lech Wałęsa (born 1943), Polish politician, former President of Poland, Nobel Prize winner, born in Popowo, 23 km of Włocławek
 Stefan Wyszyński (1901–1981), influential Polish bishop and cardinal, known as "Primate of the Millennium"
 Stanisław Zagajewski was a self-taught sculptor
Joseph Tykociński-Tykociner (1877–1969) Polish engineer and a pioneer of sound-on-film technology.

References

External links

  Municipal website
  Website of tourist information
  Blog of tourism in Włocławek and Kujawy
 The history of Diocese of Włocławek in Catholic Encyclopedia (1913)
 Story of Jews

 
Cities and towns in Kuyavian-Pomeranian Voivodeship
City counties of Poland
Brześć Kujawski Voivodeship
Warsaw Governorate
Warsaw Voivodeship (1919–1939)
Pomeranian Voivodeship (1919–1939)
Holocaust locations in Poland